The English adjective free is commonly used in one of two meanings: "at no monetary cost" (gratis) and "with little or no restriction" (libre). This ambiguity of free can cause issues where the distinction is important, as it often is in dealing with laws concerning the use of information, such as copyright and patents.

The terms gratis and libre may be used to categorise intellectual property, particularly computer programs, according to the licenses and legal restrictions that cover them, in the free software and open source communities, as well as the broader free culture movement. For example, they are used to distinguish freeware (software gratis) from free software (software libre).

Richard Stallman summarised the difference in a slogan: "Think free as in free speech, not free beer."

Gratis
Gratis in English is adopted from the various Romance and Germanic languages, ultimately descending from the plural ablative and dative form of the first-declension noun grātia in Latin. It means "free" in the sense that some goods or service is supplied without need for payment, even though it may have value.

Libre  

Libre  in English is adopted from the various Romance languages, ultimately descending from the Latin word līber; its origin is closely related to liberty. It denotes "the state of being free", as in "liberty" or "having freedom". The Oxford English Dictionary (OED) considers libre to be obsolete, but the word has come back into limited use. Unlike gratis, libre appears in few English dictionaries, although there is no other English single-word adjective signifying "liberty" exclusively, without also meaning "at no monetary cost".

"Free beer" and "freedom of speech" distinction  

In software development, where the marginal cost of an additional unit is zero, it is common for developers to make software available at no cost. One of the early and basic forms of this model is called freeware. With freeware, software is licensed freely for regular use: the developer does not gain any monetary compensation.

With the advent of the free software movement, license schemes were created to give developers more freedom in terms of code sharing, commonly called open source or free and open-source software (called FLOSS, FOSS, or F/OSS). As the English adjective free does not distinguish between "for free" and "liberty", the phrases "free as in freedom of speech" (libre, free software) and "free as in free beer" (gratis, freeware) were adopted. Many in the free software movement feel strongly about the freedom to use the software, make modifications, etc., whether or not this freely usable software is to be exchanged for money. Therefore, this distinction became important.

These phrases have become common, along with gratis and libre, in the software development and computer law fields for encapsulating this distinction. The distinction is similar to the distinction made in political science between positive liberty and negative liberty. Like "free beer", positive liberty promises equal access by all without cost or regard to income, of a given good (assuming the good exists). Like "free speech", negative liberty safeguards the right to use of something (in this case, speech) without regard to whether in a given case there is a cost involved for this use.

Uses in open-access academic publishing 

In order to reflect real-world differences in the degree of open access, the distinction between gratis open access and libre open access was added in 2006 by Peter Suber and Stevan Harnad, two of the co-drafters of the original Budapest Open Access Initiative definition of open access publishing. Gratis open access refers to online access free of charge (which Wikipedia indicates with the icon ), and libre open access refers to online access free of charge plus some additional re-use rights (Wikipedia icon ). Libre open access is equivalent to the definition of open access in the Budapest Open Access Initiative, the Bethesda Statement on Open Access Publishing and the Berlin Declaration on Open Access to Knowledge in the Sciences and Humanities. The re-use rights of libre OA are often specified by various specific Creative Commons licenses; these almost all require attribution of authorship to the original authors.

Comparison with use in software
The original gratis/libre distinction concerns software (i.e., code), with which users can potentially do two kinds of things: 1. access and use it; and 2. modify and re-use it. "Gratis" pertains to being  to access and use the code, without a price-barrier, while "libre" pertains to being  to modify and re-use the code, without a permission barrier. The target content of the open access movement, however, is not software but published, peer-reviewed research journal article texts.

1. Source code accessibility and use. For published research articles, the case for making their text accessible free for all online (Gratis) is even stronger than it is for software code, because in the case of software, some developers may wish to give their code away for free, while others may wish to sell it, whereas in the case of published research article texts, all their authors, without exception, give them away for free: None seek or get royalties or fees from their sale. On the contrary, any access-denial to potential users means loss of potential research impact (downloads, citations) for the author's research—and researcher-authors' employment, salary, promotion and funding depends in part on the uptake and impact of their research.

2. Source code modifiability and re-use. For published research articles, the case for allowing text modification and re-use is much weaker than for software code, because, unlike software, the text of a research article is not intended for modification and re-use. (In contrast, the content of research articles is and always was intended for modification and re-use: that is how research progresses.) There are no copyright barriers to modifying, developing, building upon and re-using an author's ideas and findings, once they have been published, as long as the author and published source are credited—but modifications to the published text are another matter. Apart from verbatim quotation, scholarly/scientific authors are not in general interested in allowing other authors to create "mashups" of their texts. Researcher-authors are all happy to make their texts available for harvesting and indexing for search as well as data-mining, but not for re-use in altered form (without the permission of the author).

The formal analogy between open software and open access has been made, along with the generalization of the gratis/libre distinction from the one field to the other.

See also 

 Alternative terms for free software
 Comparison of free and open-source software licenses
 Free Beer (free as freedom, not gratis)
 Free software movement
 Freedom isn't free
 Gift economy
 Open content
 Open-source license
 There ain't no such thing as a free lunch

Explanatory notes

Citations

General sources 
 Free as in Speech and Beer, book by Darren Wershler-Henry
 Stallman's discussion of FreeAsInBeer

External links 
 
 
 
 

English phrases
Free software culture and documents
Free software